BVU may refer to

Air transport
IATA code for Beluga Airport
Federal Aviation Authority location identifier for Boulder City Municipal Airport
ICAO code for Bellview Airlines (Sierra Leone)

Educational establishments
Buena Vista University
Bulgarian Virtual University
Bharati Vidyapeeth University

Other
Bristol Virginia Utilities, USA utility company
Bromovinyluracil, the metabolite of the drugs brivudine and sorivudine